Darreh Bid (also Romanized as Darreh Bīd) is a village in Mashayekh Rural District, Naghan District, Kiar County, Chaharmahal and Bakhtiari Province, Iran. At the 2006 census, its population was 301, in 56 families.

References 

Populated places in Kiar County